The history of Chinese literature extends thousands of years, from the earliest recorded dynastic court archives to the mature vernacular fiction novels that arose during the Ming dynasty to entertain the masses of literate Chinese. The introduction of widespread woodblock printing during the Tang dynasty (618–907) and the invention of movable type printing by Bi Sheng (990–1051) during the Song dynasty (960–1279) rapidly spread written knowledge throughout China. In more modern times, the author Lu Xun (1881–1936) is considered an influential voice of baihua literature in China.

Pre-classical period 
Formation of the earliest layer of Chinese literature was influenced by oral traditions of different social and professional provenance: cult and lay musical practices (Shijing), divination (Yi jing), astronomy, exorcism. An attempt at tracing the genealogy of Chinese literature to religious spells and incantations (the six zhu 六祝, as presented in the "Da zhu" chapter of the Rites of Zhou) was made by Liu Shipei.

Classical texts 

There is a wealth of early Chinese literature dating from the Hundred Schools of Thought that occurred during the Eastern Zhou dynasty (770–256 BC). The most important of these include the Classics of Confucianism, of Daoism, of Mohism, of Legalism, as well as works of military science and Chinese history. Note that, except for the books of poems and songs, most of this literature is philosophical and didactic; there is little in the way of fiction. However, these texts maintained their significance through both their ideas and their prose style.

The Confucian works in particular have been of key importance to Chinese culture and history, as a set of works known as the Four Books and Five Classics were, in the 12th century AD, chosen as the basis for the Imperial examination for any government post. These nine books therefore became the center of the educational system. They have been grouped into two categories: the Five Classics, allegedly commented and edited by Confucius, and the Four Books. The Five Classics are:
 the I Ching, or Classic of Changes, a divination manual;
 the Classic of Poetry, a collection of poems, folk songs, festival and ceremonial songs, hymns and eulogies;
 the Book of Rites or Record of Rites;
 the Book of documents, an early Chinese prose collection of documents and speeches allegedly written by rulers and officials of the early Zhou period and earlier;
 the Spring and Autumn Annals, a historical record of Confucius' native state, Lu, from 722 to 479 BC.

The Four Books are:
 the Analects of Confucius, a book of pithy sayings attributed to Confucius and recorded by his disciples;
 the Mencius, a collection of political dialogues;
 the Doctrine of the Mean, a book that teaches the path to Confucian virtue; and
 the Great Learning, a book about education, self-cultivation and the Dao.

Other important philosophical works include the Mohist Mozi, which taught "inclusive love" as both an ethical and social principle, and Hanfeizi, one of the central Legalist texts.

Important Daoist classics include the Dao De Jing, the Zhuangzi, and the Liezi. Later authors combined Daoism with Confucianism and Legalism, such as Liu An (2nd century BC), whose Huainanzi (The Philosophers of Huai-nan) also added to the fields of geography and topography.

Among the classics of military science, The Art of War by Sun Tzu (6th century BC) was perhaps the first to outline guidelines for effective international diplomacy. It was also the first in a tradition of Chinese military treatises, such as the Jingling Zongyao (Collection of the Most Important Military Techniques, 1044 AD) and the Huolongjing (Fire Dragon Manual, 14th century AD).

Historical texts, dictionaries and encyclopedias 

The Chinese kept consistent and accurate court records, and although their calendars varied from court to court, these disparate records could be aligned without evident contradiction by the year 841 BC, at the beginning of the Gonghe Regency of the Western Zhou dynasty. The earliest known narrative history of China was the Zuo Zhuan, which was compiled no later than 389 BC, and attributed to the blind 5th-century BC historian Zuo Qiuming. The Book of Documents is thought to have been compiled as far back as the 6th century BC, and was certainly compiled by the 4th century BC, the latest date for the writing of the Guodian Chu Slips unearthed in a Hubei tomb in 1993. The Book of Documents included early information on geography in the Yu Gong chapter. The Bamboo Annals found in 281 AD in the tomb of the King of Wei, who was interred in 296 BC, provide another example; however, unlike the Zuo Zhuan, the authenticity of the early date of the Bamboo Annals is in doubt. Another early text was the political strategy book of the Zhan Guo Ce, compiled between the 3rd and 1st centuries BC, with partial amounts of the text found amongst the 2nd century BC tomb site at Mawangdui. The oldest extant dictionary in China is the Erya, dated to the 3rd century BC, anonymously written but with later commentary by the historian Guo Pu (276–324). Other early dictionaries include the Fangyan by Yang Xiong (53 BC – 18 AD) and the Shuowen Jiezi by Xu Shen (58–147 AD). One of the largest was the Kangxi Dictionary compiled by 1716 under the auspices of the Kangxi Emperor (r. 1661–1722); it provides definitions for over 47,000 characters.

Although court records and other independent records existed beforehand, the definitive work in early Chinese historical writing was the Shiji, or Records of the Grand Historian written by Han dynasty court historian Sima Qian (145 BC – 90 BC). This groundbreaking text laid the foundation for Chinese historiography and the many official Chinese historical texts compiled for each dynasty thereafter. Sima Qian is often compared to the Greek Herodotus in scope and method, because he covered Chinese history from the mythical Xia dynasty until the contemporary reign of Emperor Wu of Han while retaining an objective and non-biased standpoint. This was often difficult for the official dynastic historians, who used historical works to justify the reign of the current dynasty. He influenced the written works of many Chinese historians, including the works of Ban Gu and Ban Zhao in the 1st and 2nd centuries, and even Sima Guang's 11th-century compilation of the Zizhi Tongjian, presented to Emperor Shenzong of Song in 1084 AD. The overall scope of the historiographical tradition in China is termed the Twenty-Four Histories, created for each successive Chinese dynasty up until the Ming dynasty (1368–1644); China's last dynasty, the Qing dynasty (1644–1911), is not included.

Large encyclopedias were also produced in China through the ages. The Yiwen Leiju encyclopedia was completed by Ouyang Xun in 624 during the Tang dynasty, with aid from scholars Linghu Defen and Chen Shuda. During the Song dynasty, the compilation of the Four Great Books of Song (10th century – 11th century), begun by Li Fang and completed by Cefu Yuangui, represented a massive undertaking of written material covering a wide range of different subjects. This included the Taiping Guangji (978), the Taiping Yulan (983), the Wenyuan Yinghua (986), and the Cefu Yuangui (1013). Although these Song dynasty Chinese encyclopedias featured millions of written Chinese characters each, their aggregate size paled in comparison to the later Yongle Encyclopedia (1408) of the Ming dynasty, which contained a total of 50 million Chinese characters. Even this size was trumped by later Qing dynasty encyclopedias, such as the printed Gujin Tushu Jicheng (1726), which featured over 100 million written Chinese characters in over 800,000 pages, printed in 60 different copies using copper-metal Chinese movable type printing. Other great encyclopedic writers include the polymath scientist Shen Kuo (1031–1095) and his Dream Pool Essays, the agronomist and inventor Wang Zhen (fl. 1290–1333) and his Nongshu, and the minor scholar-official Song Yingxing (1587–1666) and his Tiangong Kaiwu.

Classical poetry 

The rich tradition of Chinese poetry began with two influential collections. In northern China, the Shijing or Classic of Poetry (approx. 11th–7th century BC) comprises over 300 poems in a variety of styles ranging from those with a strong suggestion of folk music to ceremonial hymns. The word shi has the basic meaning of poem or poetry, as well as its use in criticism to describe one of China's lyrical poetic genres. Confucius is traditionally credited with editing the Shijing. Its stately verses are usually composed of couplets with lines of four characters each (or four syllables, as Chinese characters are monosyllabic), and a formal structure of end rhymes. Many of these early poems establish the later tradition of starting with a description of nature that leads into emotionally expressive statements, known as bi, or sometime . Associated with what was then considered to be southern China, the Chuci is ascribed to Qu Yuan (c. 340–278 BC) and his follower Song Yu (fl. 3rd century BC) and is distinguished by its more emotionally intense affect, often full of despair and descriptions of the fantastic. In some of its sections, the Chu Ci  uses a six-character per line meter, dividing these lines into couplets separated in the middle by a strong caesura, producing a driving and dramatic rhythm. Both the Shijing and the Chuci have remained influential throughout Chinese history.

During the greater part of China's first great period of unification, begun with the short-lived Qin dynasty (221 BC – 206 BC) and followed by the centuries-long Han dynasty (206 BC – 220 AD), the shi form of poetry underwent little innovation. But a distinctively descriptive and erudite fu form (not the same fu character as that used for the bureau of music) developed that has been called "rhyme-prose", a uniquely Han offshoot of Chinese poetry's tradition. Equally noteworthy is Music Bureau poetry (yuefu), collected and presumably refined popular lyrics from folk music. The end of the Han witnesses a resurgence of the shi poetry, with the anonymous 19 Old Poems. This collection reflects the emergence of a distinctive five-character line that later became shi poetry's most common line length. From the Jian'an reign period (196 – 220 AD) onward, the five-character line became a focus for innovations in style and theme. The Cao family, rulers of the Wei dynasty (220 – 265 AD) during the post-Han Three Kingdoms period, distinguished themselves as poets by writing poems filled with sympathy for the day-to-day struggles of soldiery and the common people. Taoist philosophy became a different, common theme for other poets, and a genre emphasizing true feeling emerged led by Ruan Ji (210–263). The landscape genre of Chinese nature poetry emerged under the brush of Xie Lingyun (385–433), as he innovated distinctively descriptive and complementary couplets composed of five-character lines. A farmland genre was born in obscurity by Tao Qian (365–427) also known as Tao Yuanming as he labored in his fields and then wrote extolling the influence of wine. Toward the close of this period in which many later-developed themes were first experimented with, the Xiao family of the Southern Liang dynasty (502–557) engaged in highly refined and often denigrated court-style poetry lushly describing sensual delights as well as the description of objects.

Reunified China's Tang dynasty (618–907) high culture set a high point for many things, including poetry. Various schools of Buddhism (a religion from India) flourished as represented by the Chan (or Zen) beliefs of Wang Wei (701–761). His quatrains (jueju) describing natural scenes are world-famous examples of excellence, each couplet conventionally containing about two distinct images or thoughts per line. Tang poetry's big star is Li Bai (701–762) also pronounced and written as Li Bo, who worked in all major styles, both the more free old style verse as well as the tonally regulated new style verse (jintishi). Regardless of genre, Tang poets notably strove to perfect a style in which poetic subjects are exposed and evident, often without directly referring to the emotional thrust at hand. The poet Du Fu (712–770) excelled at regulated verse and use of the seven-character line, writing denser poems with more allusions as he aged, experiencing hardship and writing about it. A parade of great Tang poets also includes Chen Zi'ang (661–702), Wang Zhihuan (688–742), Meng Haoran (689–740), Bai Juyi (772–846), Li He (790–816), Du Mu (803–852), Wen Tingyun (812–870), (listed chronologically) and Li Shangyin (813–858), whose poetry delights in allusions that often remain obscure, and whose emphasis on the seven-character line also contributed to the emerging posthumous fame of Du Fu, now ranked alongside Li Bai. The distinctively different ci poetry form began its development during the Tang as Central Asian and other musical influences flowed through its cosmopolitan society.

China's Song dynasty (960–1279), another reunification era after a brief period of disunity, initiated a fresh high culture. Several of its greatest poets were capable government officials as well including Ouyang Xiu (1007–1072), Su Shi (1037–1101), and Wang Anshi (1021–1086). The ci form flourished as a few hundred songs became standard templates for poems with distinctive and variously set meters. The free and expressive style of Song high culture has been contrasted with majestic Tang poems by centuries of subsequent critics who engage in fierce arguments over which dynasty had the best poetry. Additional musical influences contributed to the Yuan dynasty's (1279–1368) distinctive qu opera culture and spawned the sanqu form of individual poems based on it.

Classical Chinese poetry composition became a conventional skill of the well-educated throughout the Ming (1368–1644) and Qing (1644–1911) dynasties. Over a million poems have been preserved, including those by women, such as Dong Xiaowan and Liu Rushi, and by many other diverse voices. Painter-poets, such as Shen Zhou (1427–1509), Tang Yin (1470–1524), Wen Zhengming (1470–1559), and Yun Shouping (1633–1690), created worthy conspicuous poems as they combined art, poetry and calligraphy with brush on paper. Poetry composition competitions were socially common, as depicted in novels, for example over dessert after a nice dinner. The Song versus Tang debate continues through the centuries. While China's later imperial period does not seem to have broken new ground for innovative approaches to poetry, picking through its vast body of preserved works remains a scholarly challenge, so new treasures may yet be restored from obscurity.

Some notable poets

 Tang poetry
Bai Juyi
Cen Shen
Cao Song
Du Mu
Du Fu
Gao Pian
Gao Shi
Han Yu
He Zhizhang
Jia Dao
Lu Zhaolin
Li He
Liu Gongquan
Luo Yin
Li Bai
Liu Zongyuan
Li Shangyin
Luo Binwang
Liu Yuxi
Liu Changqing
Lu Lun
Meng Haoran
Meng Jiao
Shangguan Wan'er
Song Zhiwen
Wang Changling
Wang Wei
Wang Zhihuan
Wang Bo
Wei Yingwu
Wen Tingyun
Xue Tao
Yang Jiong
Yuan Zhen
Zhang Ji, Hubei
Zhang Ji, Jiangnan
Zhang Zhihe
Zhang Jiuling
Zhang Ruoxu

 Song poetry
Fan Zhongyan
Fan Chengda
Jiang Kui
Kou Zhun
Li Yu
Li Qingzhao
Lu You
Liu Yong
Lin Sheng
Ouyang Xiu
Qin Guan
Su Xun
Su Shi
Su Zhe
Sima Guang
Shi Dazu
Wang Anshi
Wang Yisun
Wen Tianxiang
Wu Wenying
Xin Qiji
Yang Wanli
Yan Jidao
Yan Shu
Yue Fei
Ye Shaoweng
Zhang Xian
Zeng Gong
Zhou Bangyan

Classical prose 
Early Chinese prose was deeply influenced by the great philosophical writings of the Hundred Schools of Thought (770–221 BC). The works of Mo Zi (墨子), Mencius (孟子) and Zhuang Zi (莊子) contain well-reasoned, carefully developed discourses that reveal much stronger organization and style than their predecessors. Mo Zi's polemic prose was built on solid and effective methodological reasoning. Mencius contributed elegant diction and, like Zhuang Zi, relied on comparisons, anecdotes, and allegories. By the 3rd century BC, these writers had developed a simple, concise and economical prose style that served as a model of literary form for over 2,000 years. They were written in Classical Chinese, the language spoken during the Spring and Autumn period.

During the Tang period, the ornate, artificial style of prose developed in previous periods was replaced by a simple, direct, and forceful prose based on examples from the Hundred Schools (see above) and from the Han period, the period in which the great historical works of Sima Tan and Sima Qian were published. This neoclassical style dominated prose writing for the next 800 years. It was exemplified in the work of Han Yu 韓愈 (768–824), a master essayist and strong advocate of a return to Confucian orthodoxy; Han Yu was later listed as one of the "Eight Great Prose Masters of the Tang and Song".

The Song dynasty saw the rise in popularity of "travel record literature" (youji wenxue). Travel literature combined both diary and narrative prose formats, it was practiced by such seasoned travelers as Fan Chengda (1126–1193) and Xu Xiake (1587–1641) and can be seen in the example of Su Shi's Record of Stone Bell Mountain.

After the 14th century, vernacular fiction became popular, at least outside of court circles. Vernacular fiction covered a broader range of subject matter and was longer and more loosely structured than literary fiction. One of the masterpieces of Chinese vernacular fiction is the 18th-century domestic novel Dream of the Red Chamber (紅樓夢).

Some notable contributors 

Eight Great Prose Masters of the Tang and Song (唐宋八大家)
Han Yu
Liu Zongyuan
Ouyang Xiu
Su Zhe
Su Shi
Su Xun (蘇洵)
Wang Anshi
Zeng Gong
Two great scientific authors from the Song period:
Shen Kuo (1031–1095)
Su Song (1020–1101)
 Ming dynasty
 Song Lian (1310–1381)
 Liu Bowen (1311–1375)
 Jiao Yu
 Gui Youguang (1506–1571)
 Yuan Hongdao (1568–1610)
 Xu Xiake (1586–1641)
 Gao Qi
 Zhang Dai
 Tu Long
 Wen Zhenheng
 Qing dynasty
 Li Yu (1610–1680)
 Yao Nai (1731–1815)
 Yuan Mei (1716–1798)
 Gong Zizhen (1792–1841)
 Wei Yuan (1794–1857)

Classical fiction and drama 
Chinese fiction was rooted in the official histories and such less formal works as A New Account of the Tales of the World and Investigations of the Supernatural (4th and 5th century); Finest Flowers from the World of Letters (a 10th-century compilation of works from earlier centuries); Great Tang Record on the Western Regions completed by the pilgrim to India, Xuanzang in 646; Variety Dishes from Youyang, the best known collection of Classical Chinese chuanqi (Marvelous Tales) from the Tang dynasty; and the Taiping Guangji, which preserved the corpus of these Tang dynasty tales. There was a range of less formal works either oral or using oral conventions, such as the bianwen (Buddhist tale), pinghua (plain tale), and huaben (novella), which formed background to the novel as early as the Song dynasty. The novel as an extended prose narrative which realistically creates a believable world of its own evolved in China and in Europe from the 14th–18th centuries, though a little earlier in China. Chinese audiences were more interested in history and Chinese authors generally did not present their works as fictional. Readers appreciated relative optimism, moral humanism, relative emphasis on group behavior, and welfare of the society.

With the rise of monetary economy and urbanization beginning in the Song dynasty, there was a growing professionalization of entertainment fostered by the spread of printing, the rise of literacy and education. In both China and Europe, the novel gradually became more autobiographical and serious in exploration of social, moral, and philosophical problems. Chinese fiction of the late Ming dynasty and early Qing dynasty was varied, self-conscious, and experimental. In China, however, there was no counterpart to the 19th-century European explosion of revolution and romanticism. 

Novels of the Ming and early Qing dynasties represented a pinnacle of classical Chinese fiction. Highlights include:

Classic novels:
The Romance of the Three Kingdoms, by Luo Guanzhong
The Water Margin (also translated as Outlaws of the Marsh), by Shi Naian
The Journey to the West, by Wu Cheng'en
The Dream of the Red Chamber, by Cao Xueqin
Jin Ping Mei (金瓶梅, The Plum in the Golden Vase), by the Scoffing Scholar of Lanling (蘭陵笑笑生) - a spin-off from Water Margin
The Scholars, by Wu Jingzi (吳敬梓)
Classic long and short fiction:
 Notable Gong'an fictions:
Cases of Judge Bao 包公案 (Baogong An) (1594)
The Chalk Circle 灰闌記
Celebrated Cases of Judge Dee 狄公案
Cases of Judge Shi 施公案
Cases of Judge Lan 藍公案
Cases of Judge Peng 彭公案
Cases of Judge Hai 海公案
The Three Heroes and Five Gallants 三侠五義 by Shi Yukun
The Five Younger Gallants 小五義 by Shi Yukun
Three Stories and Two Slaps:
Illustrious Words to Instruct the World 喻世明言 (Yushi Mingyan), or Stories Old and New (1620) by Feng Menglong
Stories to Caution the World (警世通言Jingshi Tongyan) by Feng Menglong.
Stories to Awaken the World (醒世恒言 Xingshi Hengyan) by Feng Menglong
Slapping the Table in Amazement (初刻拍案驚奇 Chuke Paian Jingji) by Ling Mengchu
The Second Collection of Slapping the Table in Amazement (二刻拍案驚奇 Erke Paian Jingji) by Ling Mengchu
A Supplement to the Journey to the West (西遊補; Xī Yóu Bǔ) (c. 1640) by Dong Yue
Haoqiu zhuan (The pleasing history or The Fortunate Union) (c. 1683)
Strange Stories from a Chinese Studio (聊齋志異), by Pu Songling
Flowers in the Mirror (鏡花緣, Jing huayuan) by Li Ruzhen
Investiture of the Gods (封神演義, Fengshenyanyi; also known as Fengshen Bang (封神榜))
Xingshi Yinyuan Zhuan ( or The Story of a Marital Fate to Awaken the World)
Dijing Jingwulue (帝京景物略 or Survey of Scenery and Monuments in the Imperial Capital), by Liu Tong
Chronicles of the Eastern Zhou Kingdoms (東周列國志) by Feng Menglong, edited by Cai Yuanfang (蔡元放)
The Carnal Prayer Mat an erotic novel by Li Yu (李渔) 1657.
Six Records of a Floating Life (浮生六記 Fú Shēng Liù Jì) by Shen Fu. Early 19th century.
Ernü Yingxiong Zhuan (The Story of Hero Boys and Hero Girls) by Wen Kang first published 1878.
Series of historical fictions regarding Tang and Song dynasties:
Stories of Tang Dynasty (說唐 Shuo Tang)
Xue Rengui's Expedition to the East (薛仁貴征東)
Xue Dingshan's Expedition to the West (薛丁山征西)
Xue Gang's Uprising against Tang Dynasty (薛剛反唐)
Romance of Sui and Tang Dynasties (隋唐演義)
General Yue Fei (說岳全傳 Shuo Yue Quan Zhuan)
The Generals of the Yang Family ('ˊ楊家将)
Stories of Huyan Family (說呼全傳 Shuo Hu Quan Zhuan)
Stories of Flying Dragon (飛龍全傳 Feilong Quanzhuan)
The Four Great Novels of Exposure in Late Qing Dynasty:
The Travels of Lao Can (Lao Can Youji 老殘遊記) by Liu E 1903
Bizarre Happenings Eyewitnessed over Two Decades (二十年目睹之怪現狀) by Wu Jianren
Officialdom Unmasked (Guanchang Xianxing Ji 官場現形記) by Li Baojia
A Flower in a Sinful Sea (Nie Hai Hua 孽海花) by Jin Tianhe and Zeng Pu
Drama:
Romance of the Western Chamber (西廂記, Xīxiāngjì), by Wang Shifu (王實甫)
The Injustice to Dou E (竇娥冤, Dou E Yuan), by Guan Hanqing 
The Jade Hairpin (Yuzanji 玉簪記), by Gao Lian (高濂)
Hui Lan Ji (灰闌記), by Li Xingdao (李行道) became the basis for The Caucasian Chalk Circle
The Peony Pavilion (Mudan Ting 牡丹亭), by Tang Xianzu
The Peach Blossom Fan (Taohua Shan 桃花扇) by Kong Shangren (孔尚任)
The Palace of Eternal Life (長生殿), by Hong Sheng (洪昇)
 The Orphan of Zhao (趙氏孤兒), a 13th-century play by Ji Junxiang (紀君祥), was the first Chinese play to have been translated into a European language.
Four Great Tales of Folklore:
Legend of the White Snake (白蛇傳, Baishezhuan)
Lady Meng Jiang (孟姜女, Mengjiangnv)
The Cowherd and the Weaver Girl (牛郎織女, Niulangzhinv)
Butterfly Lovers (梁山伯與祝英台, Liangshanboyuzhuyingtai)

Modern literature

Late Qing (1895–1911) 
Scholars now tend to agree that modern Chinese literature did not erupt suddenly in the New Culture Movement (1917–23). Instead, they trace its origins back at least to the late Qing period (1895–1911). The late Qing was a period of intellectual ferment sparked by a sense of national crisis. Intellectuals began to seek solutions to China's problems outside of its own tradition. They translated works of Western expository writing and literature, which enthralled readers with new ideas and opened up windows onto new exotic cultures. Most outstanding were the translations of Yan Fu (嚴復) (1864–1921) and Lin Shu (林紓) (1852–1924). In this climate, a boom in the writing of fiction occurred, especially after the 1905 abolition of the civil service examination when literati struggled to fill new social and cultural roles for themselves. Stylistically, this fiction shows signs of both the Chinese novelistic tradition and Western narrative modes. In subject matter, it is strikingly concerned with the contemporary: social problems, historical upheaval, changing ethical values, etc. In this sense, late Qing fiction is modern. Important novelists of the period include Wu Woyao (吳沃堯) (1866–1910), Li Boyuan (李伯元) (1867–1906), Liu E (劉鶚) (1857–1909), and Zeng Pu (曾樸) (1872–1935).

The late Qing also saw a "revolution in poetry" (詩界革命), which promoted experimentation with new forms and the incorporation of new registers of language. However, the poetry scene was still dominated by the adherents to the Tongguang School (named after the Tongzhi and Guangxu reigns of the Qing), whose leaders—Chen Yan (陳衍), Chen Sanli (陳三立), Zheng Xiaoxu (鄭孝胥), and Shen Zengzhi (沈曾植)—promoted a Song style in the manner of Huang Tingjian. These poets would become the objects of scorn by New Culturalists like Hu Shih, who saw their work as overly allusive, artificial, and divorced from contemporary reality.

In drama, the late Qing saw the emergence of the new "civilized drama" (文明戲), a hybrid of Chinese operatic drama with Western-style spoken drama. Peking opera and "reformed Peking opera" were also popular at the time.

Republican Era (1912–49) 

The literary scene in the first few years before the collapse of the Qing in 1911 was dominated by popular love stories, some written in the classical language and some in the vernacular. This entertainment fiction would later be labeled "Mandarin Ducks and Butterflies" fiction by New Culturalists, who despised its lack of social engagement. Throughout much of the Republican era, Butterfly fiction would reach many more readers than its "progressive" counterpart.

In the course of the New Culture Movement (1917–23), the vernacular language largely displaced the classical in all areas of literature and writing. Literary reformers Hu Shih (1891–1962) and Chen Duxiu (1880–1942) declared the classical language "dead" and promoted the vibrant vernacular in its stead. Hu Shih once said, "A dead language can never produce a living literature."  In terms of literary practice, Lu Xun (1881–1936) is usually said to be the first major stylist in the new vernacular prose that Hu Shih and Chen Duxiu were promoting. Another female writer who, in the words of scholar Nicole Huang, "persistently experimented with new literary language" is Eileen Chang.

Though often said to be less successful than their counterparts in fiction writing, poets also experimented with the vernacular in new poetic forms, such as free verse and the sonnet. Given that there was no tradition of writing poetry in the vernacular, these experiments were more radical than those in fiction writing and also less easily accepted by the reading public. Modern poetry flourished especially in the 1930s, in the hands of poets like Zhu Xiang (朱湘), Dai Wangshu, Li Jinfa (李金發), Wen Yiduo, and Ge Xiao (葛蕭). Other poets, even those among the May Fourth radicals (e.g., Yu Dafu), continued to write poetry in classical styles.

May Fourth radicalism, combined with changes in the education system, made possible the emergence of a large group of women writers. While there had been women writers in the late imperial period and the late Qing, they had been few in number. These writers generally tackled domestic issues, such as relations between the sexes, family, friendship and war, Eileen Chang's writing uses the spatial specificities of the modern apartment as essential to the construction of a vision of life in wartime. But they were revolutionary in giving direct expression to female subjectivity. Ding Ling's story Miss Sophia's Diary exposes the thoughts and feelings of its female diarist in all their complexity.

The 1920s and 1930s saw the emergence of spoken drama. Most outstanding among playwrights of the day are Ouyang Yuqian, Hong Shen, Tian Han, and Cao Yu. More popular than this Western-style drama, however, was Peking opera, raised to new artistic heights by the likes of Mei Lanfang.

In these decades, mass-appeal fiction which elites deemed culturally insignificant became known as "butterfly fiction," a label largely equivalent to the English phrase low-brow fiction.

In the late 1920s and 1930s, literary journals and societies espousing various artistic theories proliferated. Among the major writers of the period were Guo Moruo (1892–1978), a poet, historian, essayist, and critic; Mao Dun (1896–1981), the first of the novelists to emerge from the League of Left-Wing Writers and one whose work reflected the revolutionary struggle and disillusionment of the late 1920s; satirist and novelist Lao She (1899–1966); and Ba Jin (1904–2005), a novelist whose work was influenced by Ivan Turgenev and other Russian writers. In the 1930s Ba Jin produced a trilogy that depicted the struggle of modern youth against the ageold dominance of the Confucian family system. Comparison often is made between Jia (Family), one of the novels in the trilogy, and Dream of the Red Chamber. Many of these writers became important as administrators of artistic and literary policy after 1949. Most of those authors who were still alive during the Cultural Revolution (1966–76) were either purged or forced to submit to public humiliation.

The League of Left-Wing Writers founded in 1930 included Lu Xun among its leadership. By 1932 it had adopted the Soviet doctrine of socialist realism; that is, the insistence that art must concentrate on contemporary events in a realistic way, exposing the ills of nonsocialist society and promoting a glorious future under communism.

Other styles of literature were at odds with the highly-political literature being promoted by the League. The "New Sensationists" (新感覺派)—a group of writers based in Shanghai who were influenced, to varying degrees, by Western and Japanese modernism—wrote fiction that was more concerned with the unconscious and with aesthetics than with politics or social problems. Most important among these writers were Mu Shiying, Liu Na'ou (劉吶鷗), and Shi Zhecun. Other writers, including Shen Congwen and Fei Ming (廢名), balked at the utilitarian role for literature by writing lyrical, almost nostalgic, depictions of the countryside. Lin Yutang, who had studied at Harvard and Leipzig, introduced the concept of youmo (humor), which he used in trenchant criticism of China's political and cultural situation before leaving for the United States.

Themes of "revolution plus love" became a left-wing literary fashion during the 1930s, although it was also criticized from the left including by Mao Dun. In this narrative formula, the story begins with conflict between the revolutionary mission and romantic love, followed by calls for the protagonists to devote themselves to revolution and set aside their personal feelings, and ultimately results in the couple working together for the revolution in a form of love itself. As described by academic David Der-Wei Wang, "[R]evolution plus love functioned both as a literary trope, titillating and sustaining a society's desire for self-reform, and as a political mandate, calling for the redisposition of the social body in both public and personal spheres."  

The Chinese Communist Party had established a base after the Long March in Yan'an. In 1942, Mao Zedong gave a series of lectures called "Talks at the Yan'an Forum on Art and Literature" that clearly made literature subservient to politics via the Yan'an Rectification Movement. The Yan'an Talks articulated the view that socialist literature should not merely reflect existing culture, but should help culturally produce the consciousness of a new society. Mao articulated five independent although related categories of creative consideration for socialist cultural production: (1) class stand, (2) attitude, (3) audience, (4) work style, and (5) popularization/massification. The Yan'an Talks would become the national guideline for culture after the establishment of the People's Republic of China.

Consistent with political goals of mobilizing the masses, literary depictions of Party cadres became important. Literature of the period represented good cadres as those who took the lead on the road to socialism while adopting a theme of antibureaucratism to criticize cadres who sought special privileges.

Maoist Era (1949–76) 
After coming to power in 1949, the Communists gradually nationalized the publishing industry, centralized the book distribution system, and brought writers under institutional control through the Writers Union. A system of strict censorship was implemented, with Mao's Yan'an Talks as the guiding force. Periodic literary campaigns targeted figures such as Hu Shih and other figures from the New Culture period, especially Hu Feng, a protege of Lu Xun who, along with his wife Mei Zhi, did not toe the Party line on literature. Socialist realism became the uniform style, and many Soviet works were translated. 

The ability to satirize and expose the evils in contemporary society that had made writers useful to the Chinese Communist Party before its accession to power was no longer welcomed. Party cultural leaders such as Zhou Yang used Mao's call to have literature "serve the people" to mount attacks on "petty bourgeois idealism" and "humanitarianism". This conflict came to a head in the Hundred Flowers Campaign (1956–57). Mao Zedong initially encouraged writers to speak out against problems in the new society. Having learned the lessons of the anti-Hu Feng campaign, they were reluctant, but then a flurry of newspaper articles, films, and literary works drew attention to such problems as bureaucratism and authoritarianism within the ranks of the party. Shocked at the level of discontent, Mao's Anti-Rightist Movement put large numbers of intellectuals through "thought reform" or sent them to labor camps. 

At the time of the Great Leap Forward (1957–59), the government increased its insistence on the use of socialist realism and combined with it so-called revolutionary realism and revolutionary romanticism. Class struggle was a frequent narrative structure and political mode of expression in literature of the late 1950s. These narratives depicted class struggle as a way to resolve social conflict, usually through the protagonists uncovering a conspiracy between new and old class enemies. 

Despite the literary control and strictures to limit subjects to contemporary China and the glories of the revolution, writers produced widely read novels of energy and commitment. Examples of this new socialist literature include The Builder (Chuangye Shi 創業史) by Liu Qing 柳青, The Song of Youth (Qing Chun Zhi Ge 青春之歌) by Yang Mo, Tracks in the Snowy Forest (Lin Hai Xue Yuan 林海雪原) by Qu Bo, Keep the Red Flag Flying (Hong Qi Pu 紅旗譜) by Liang Bin 梁斌, The Red Sun (Hong Ri 紅日) by Wu Qiang 吳強, and Red Crag by Luo Guangbin 羅廣斌 and Yang Yiyan (楊益言).

During the 1960s, the Maoist view of class struggle focused on challenging revisionism within society through the socialist education movement, and, motivated by concerns that Party bureaucrats might become a new bourgeoisie, implementing class struggle within the party itself. Literature of the period reflected both strands of class struggle.

Cultural Revolution 
During the Cultural Revolution (1966–1976), Mao's wife, Jiang Qing led the campaign against "feudal" and "bourgeois" culture. The only stage productions allowed were her "Eight Model Operas", which combined traditional and western forms, while great fanfare was given to politically orthodox films and heroic novels, such as those by Hao Ran (浩然). The period has long been regarded as a cultural wasteland, but some now suggest that the leading works have an energy which is still of interest.

The principles for cultural production laid out by Mao in the 1942 Talks at the Yan'an Forum became dogmatized during the Cultural Revolution.

Mao Zedong has also written several poems such as:
Changsha 沁园春·长沙1925
Double Ninth Festival 采桑子·重阳 1929
Long March 七律·长征 1935
Snow 沁园春·雪 1936
The People's Liberation Army occupied Nanjing 七律·人民解放军占领南京 1949
Swimming 水调歌头·游泳 1956
Ode to the Plum Blossom 卜算子咏梅 1961

Opening and reform (1978–1989) 
The arrest of Jiang Qing and the other members of the Gang of Four in 1976, and especially the reforms initiated at the Third Plenum of the Eleventh National Party Congress Central Committee in December 1978, led writers to take up their pens again. Much of the literature in what would be called the "new era" (新時期) discussed the serious abuses of power that had taken place at both the national and the local levels during the Cultural Revolution. The writers decried the waste of time and talent during that decade and bemoaned abuses that had held China back. This literature, often called "scar literature", or "the literature of the wounded", discussed the experiences of sent-down youth with great though not complete frankness and conveyed disquieting views of the party and the political system. Intensely patriotic, these authors wrote cynically of the political leadership that gave rise to the extreme chaos and disorder of the Cultural Revolution. Many of these themes and attitudes were also found in Fifth Generation films of directors trained after 1978, many of which were based on published novels and short stories. Some of this fiction and cinema extended the blame to the entire generation of leaders and to the political system itself. The political authorities were faced with a serious problem: how could they encourage writers to criticize and discredit the abuses of the Cultural Revolution without allowing that criticism to go beyond what they considered tolerable limits?

During this period, the number of literary magazines rose sharply, and many from before the Cultural Revolution were revived. Poetry also changed in its form and content. Four "misty poets", Bei Dao, Gu Cheng, Duo Duo and Yang Lian expressed themselves in deliberately obscure verse which reflected subjective realism rather than the realism of the sort promoted during the Cultural Revolution. There was a special interest in foreign works. Recent foreign literature was translated, often without carefully considering its interest for the Chinese reader. Literary magazines specializing in translations of foreign short stories became very popular, especially among the young.

Some leaders in the government, literary and art circles feared change was happening too fast. The first reaction came in 1980 with calls to combat "bourgeois liberalism", a campaign that was repeated in 1981. These two difficult periods were followed by the Anti-Spiritual Pollution Campaign in late 1983.

At the same time, writers remained freer to write in unconventional styles and to treat sensitive subject matter. A spirit of literary experimentation flourished in the second half of the 1980s. Fiction writers such as Wang Meng, Zhang Xinxin, and Zong Pu and dramatists such as Gao Xingjian experimented with modernist language and narrative modes. Another group of writers—collectively said to constitute the Xungen movement—including Han Shaogong, Mo Yan, Ah Cheng, and Jia Pingwa sought to reconnect literature and culture to Chinese traditions, from which a century of modernization and cultural and political iconoclasm had severed them. Other writers such as Yu Hua, Ge Fei, and Su Tong experimented in a more avant-garde mode of writing that was daring in form and language and showed a complete loss of faith in ideals of any sort.

Post-Tiananmen (1989–present) 

In the wake of the Tiananmen massacre of 1989 and with the intensification of market reforms, literature and culture turned increasingly commercial and escapist. Wang Shuo, the so-called "hooligan" writer, is the most obvious manifestation of this commercial shift, though his fiction is not without serious intent. Some writers, such as Yan Lianke, continue to take seriously the role of literature in exposing social problems; his novel Dreams of Ding Village deals with the plight of HIV-AIDS victims. As in the May Fourth Movement, women writers came to the fore. Many of them, such as Chen Ran, Wei Hui, Wang Anyi, and Hong Ying, explore female subjectivity in a radically changing society. Neo-realism is another important current in post-Tiananmen fiction, for instance in the writings of Liu Heng, Chi Li, Fang Fang, He Dun, and Zhu Wen.

According to Martin Woesler trends in contemporary Chinese literature include: 'cult literature' with Guo Jingming's Cry Me a Sad River, vagabond literature with Xu Zechen's Running Through Beijing Liu Zhenyun's The Pickpockets, underground literature with Mian Mian's Panda Sex, divided in historicizing literature with Yu Dan's Confucius in Your Heart, 'longing for something' literature such as Yi Zhongtian, and in Tibetan literature with Alai, literature of the mega cities, women's literature with Bi Shumin's Women’s Boxing and The Female Psychologist, master narratives by narrators like Mo Yan with Life and Death are Wearing Me Out. Oblique social criticism is also a popular form, for example Han Han's novel His land, which was written in a surreal style opposed to the uncritical mainstream, but ranked 1st in 2009 Chinese bestseller list. Another example is Yan Ge's novel Family of Joy, which was written in Sichuanese and won the Chinese Media Group New Talent Award in 2013.

Chinese language literature also flourishes in the diaspora—in South East Asia, the United States, and Europe. According to a 2014 report from the International Publishing Association, China is the largest publisher of books, magazines and newspapers in the world by volume. In book publishing alone, some 128,800 new titles of books were published in 2005, according to the General Administration of Press and Publication. There are more than 600 literary journals across the country. Living in France but continuing to write primarily in Chinese, Gao Xingjian became the first Chinese writer to receive the Nobel Prize for Literature in 2000. In 2012, Mo Yan also received the Nobel Prize in Literature. In 2015, children's author Cao Wenxuan was awarded the Hans Christian Andersen Award, the first Chinese author to win the top international children's book prize (although several Chinese authors had previously been nominated).

Online literature 

In the new millennium, online literature in China plays a much more important role than in the United States and the rest of the world. Most books are available online, where the most popular novels find millions of readers. They cost an average of 2 CNY, or roughly a tenth of the average price of a printed book.

Shanda Literature Ltd. is an online publishing company that claims to publish 8,000 Chinese literary works daily.

Book market 

China buys many foreign book rights; nearly 16 million copies of the sixth book of the Harry Potter series were sold in Chinese translation. As China Book Review reported, the rights to 9,328 foreign titles – including many children's books – went to China in 2007. China was nominated as a Guest of Honour at the Frankfurt Bookfair in 2009.

The book market in China traditionally orders books during book fairs, because the country lacks a national book ordering system. In 2006, 6.8 million titles were sold, not including an unknown number of banned titles, bootleg copies and underground publishing factories. Seven percent of all publishers are located in Shanghai. Because the industry lacks a national distribution system, many titles from publishers in the provinces can only be found there.

The central publishing houses belonging to ministries or (other) government institutions have their main seat at Beijing (40 percent of all publishers). Most regional publishing houses are situated in the capitals of the provinces. Universities also have associated presses. Private publishing is tolerated. 220,000 books were published in 2005. Among 579 publishers—almost five times more than thirty years ago—225 are supervised by ministries, commissions or the army; 348 are controlled by agencies; and six are even more independent. On the other hand, 100,000 private bookstores bring in the half of the income of the book industry.

China's state-run General Administration of Press and Publication (新聞出版總署) screens all Chinese literature intended to be sold on the open market. The GAPP has the legal authority to screen, censor, and ban any print, electronic, or Internet publication in China. Because all publishers in China are required to be licensed by the GAPP, that agency also has the power to deny people the right to publish, and completely shut down any publisher who fails to follow its dictates. As a result, the ratio of official to unlicensed books is said to be 2:3. According to a report in ZonaEuropa, there are more than 4,000 underground publishing factories around China. The Chinese government continues to hold public book burnings on unapproved yet popular "spiritual pollution" literature, though critics claim this spotlight on individual titles only helps fuel booksales. Many new-generation Chinese authors who were targeted by such government action have been subsequently published in English and found success in western literary markets, such as Wei Hui's Shanghai Baby, Anchee Min's controversial memoir Red Azalea, Time magazine banned-book covergirl Chun Sue's Beijing Doll, and Mian Mian's Candy. Online bestseller Ghost Blows Out the Light had to be rewritten to remove references to the supernatural before it could be released in print.

Impact of translation on modern and contemporary Chinese writers 

Translated literature has long played an important role in modern China. Some writers, such as Lu Xun, Yu Dafu, Ba Jin and others were literary translators themselves, and many present day writers in China, such as the Nobel laureate Mo Yan, listed translated works as sources of enlightenment and inspiration.

History books about Chinese literature 
The first two known history books about Chinese literature were published by Japanese authors in the Japanese language. Kojō Tandō wrote the 700 page Shina bungakushi (支那文学史; "History of Chinese Literature"), published in 1897.  wrote the second ever such book in 1898, also called Shina bungakushi.

Lin Quanjia was inspired by a 1903 translation of Sasakawa's book.

Contemporary Chinese literature in translation 
Chinese literature is increasingly available in translation- there are now several well-established websites sharing information, for example, Paper Republic, Writing Chinese, Chinese Short Stories, My Chinese Books, Chinese Books for Young Readers.
 
In 2005, the Chinese government started a sponsoring program for translations of government-approved Chinese works, which has already resulted in more than 200 books being translated from Chinese into other languages.

Selected modern Chinese writers 

 Ba Jin (巴金) (1904–2005)
 Bei Dao (北島) (1949—)
 Bing Xin (冰心) (1900–1999)
 Can Xue (殘雪) (1953–)
 Cao Wenxuan (曹文轩) (1955-)
 Cao Yu (曹禺) (1910–1996)
 Eileen Chang (張愛玲) (1920–1995)
 Chen Zhongshi (陳忠實) (1942—2016)
 Chiung Yao (琼瑶) (1938—)
 Cong Weixi (從維熙) (1933—2019)
 Feng Zikai (豐子愷) (1898–1975)
 Gao Xingjian (高行健) (1940–)
 Guo Moruo (郭沫若) (1892–1978)
 He Qifang (何其芳) (1912–1977)
 Hu Shih (胡適) (1891–1962)
 Jia Pingwa (賈平凹) (1952—)
 Jidi Majia (吉狄馬加) (1961–)
 Jin Yong (金庸) (1924–2018) (Pen name of Louis Cha Leung-yung)
 Lao She (老舍) (1897–1966)
 Liang Qichao (梁啟超) (1873–1929)
 Liang Shiqiu (梁實秋) (1903–1987)
 Lin Haiyin (林海音) (1918–2001)
 Lin Yutang (林語堂) (1895–1976)
 Liu E (劉鶚) (1857–1909)
 Lu Xun (魯迅) (1881–1936)
 Ma Jian (馬建) (1953—)
 Mao Dun (茅盾) (1896–1981)
 Mo Yan (莫言) (1955—)
 Qian Zhongshu (錢鍾書) (1910–1988)
 Qiu Miaojin (邱妙津) (1969–1995)
 Qu Bo (writer) (曲波) (1922–2002)
 Sanmao (author) (三毛) (1943–1991)
 Shen Congwen (沈從文) (1902–1988)
 Shi Tiesheng (史鐵生) (1951–2010)
 Su Manshu (蘇曼殊) (1894–1918)
 Su Tong (蘇童) (1963—)
 Tian Han (田漢) (1898–1968)
 Tie Ning (鐵凝) (1957—)
 Wang Guowei (王國維) (1877–1927)
 Wang Tao (王韜) (1828–1897)
 Wang Xiaobo (王小波) (1952–1997)
 Wang Zengqi (汪曾祺) (1920–1997)
 Wen Yiduo (聞一多) (1899–1946)
 Xiao Hong (萧红) (1911–1942)
 Xu Dishan (許地山) (1893–1941)
 Xu Zhimo (徐志摩) (1896–1936)
 Yan Fu (嚴復) (1853–1924)
 Yan Lianke (阎连科) (1958–)
 Yang Mu (楊牧) (1940–2020)
 Ye Shengtao (葉聖陶) (1894–1988)
 Yu Dafu (郁達夫) (1896–1945)
 Zhang Xianliang (張賢亮) (1936—2014)
 Zhang Xinxin (张辛欣) (1953-)
 Zhang Zao (張棗) (1962–2010)
 Zhu Ziqing (朱自清) (1898–1948)

Writers of Chinese heritage who write in other languages 

Chinese writers writing in English:
See also List of Asian-American writers, Chinese American literature
 Ha Jin (哈金) (1956—)
 Chiang Yee (1903–1977)
 Amy Tan (譚恩美) (1952–)
 Yiyun Li
 Qiu Xiaolong
 Tao Lin (1983–)

Chinese writers writing in French:
 Chen Jitong (陳季同) (1852–1907)
 François Cheng (程抱一) (1929—)
 Dai Sijie (戴思傑) (1954—)
 Shan Sa (山颯) (1972—)

See also 

Censorship in the People's Republic of China
Chen prophecy
Chinese classic texts
Chinese culture
Chinese dictionary
Chinese encyclopedias
Chinese language
Chinese mythology
Classical Chinese poetry
Dream Pool Essays
Huainanzi
List of Chinese authors
List of Hong Kong poets
List of poems in Chinese or by Chinese poets
Literature of Hong Kong
Society and culture of the Han dynasty
Taiwanese literature
Tea classics
Women in Chinese literature

Notes

References

Citations

Sources 
These are general works. For those on specific topics, please see the particular article.

 Cai, Zong-qi, ed. (2008). How to Read Chinese Poetry: A Guided Anthology. New York: Columbia University Press. 
 Chaves, Jonathan, ed. (1986). The Columbia Book of Later Chinese Poetry: Yüan, Ming, and Ch'ing Dynasties (1279–1911). New York: Columbia University Press. 
 
Cheng, François (1982). Chinese Poetic Writing. Trans. Donald A. Riggs and Jerome P. Seaton. Bloomington: Indiana Univ. Press. 
Cui, Jie and Zong-qi Cai (2012). How to Read Chinese Poetry Workbook. New York: Columbia University Press. 
 
 Idema Wilt L., and Lloyd Haft, eds (1997). A Guide to Chinese Literature. Ann Arbor: Center for Chinese Studies, University of Michigan, Michigan Monographs in Chinese Studies. . Bibliographical and background essays.
 Knight, Sabina (2012). Chinese Literature: A Very Short Introduction. Oxford; New York: Oxford University Press, Very Short Introductions Series. .
 Lévy, André (2000). Chinese Literature, Ancient and Classical. Bloomington: Indiana University Press. Translated by William H. Nienhauser. xi, 168p. .
Lin, Shuen-fu and Stephen Owen (1986). The Vitality of the Lyric Voice. Princeton: Princeton Univ. Press. 
Liu, James J.Y. (1962). The Art of Chinese Poetry. Chicago: Univ. of Chicago Press. 
 Mair, Victor H. (2001). The Columbia History of Chinese Literature. New York: Columbia University Press. .
 Mair, Victor H.(1994). The Columbia Anthology of Traditional Chinese Literature. New York: Columbia University Press, Translation from the Asian Classics, 1994. .
 Mair, Victor H., Nancy Shatzman Steinhardt and Paul Rakita Goldin, eds. Hawai'i Reader in Traditional Chinese Culture. (Honolulu: University of Hawai'i Press, 2005). .
 Nienhauser, William H., Jr. (1986 and 1998). The Indiana Companion to Traditional Chinese Literature. 2v. Bloomington: Indiana University Press. , 0-253-33456-X.

 Kang-i Sun Chang, Stephen Owen, eds. (2010), The Cambridge History of Chinese Literature, 2 vol. Cambridge: Cambridge University Press. 
 Watson, Burton (1971). Chinese Lyricism: Shih Poetry from the Second to the Twelfth Century. New York: Columbia University Press. 
 Watson, Burton, ed. (1984). The Columbia Book of Chinese Poetry: From Early Times to the Thirteenth Century. New York: Columbia University Press.

External links 

 Paper Republic – Chinese Literature in Translation – useful site, and produces annual list of translations into English (2015, 2014, 2013, 2012)
 MCLC Resource Center—Literature – bibliography of scholarly studies and translations of modern Chinese literature
 Modern Chinese Literature and Culture – scholarly journal
 Chinese Text Sampler – Annotated collection of classical and modern Chinese literary texts
 Chinese Text Project – Early classical texts with English and modern Chinese translations
 http://www.china-on-site.com/comicindex.php – manhua retellings of old Chinese legends
 Renditions – English translations of modern and classical Chinese literature
 China the Beautiful – Chinese Art and Literature – Early classical texts
Chinese Text Sampler: Readings in Chinese Literature, History, and Popular Culture – Annotated Collection of Digitized Chinese Texts for Students of Chinese Language and Culture
The Columbia University Press web page accompanying Cai 2008 has PDF and MP3 files for more than 75 poems and CUP's web page accompanying Cui 2012 includes MP3 files of modern Chinese translations for dozens of these

 
History of literature
Chinese philosophy
China in fiction